The 1932 Washington State Cougars football team was an American football team that represented Washington State College in the Pacific Coast Conference during the 1932 college football season. In its seventh season under head coach Babe Hollingbery, the team compiled a 7–1–1 record (5–1–1 in PCC, runner-up), shut out six of nine opponents, and outscored all opponents 130 to 28.

Halfback George Sander of Spokane was selected by the Associated Press (AP), United Press (UP), and Newspaper Enterprise Association (NEA) as a first-team player on the All-Coast team. Out of North Central High School, Sander was also selected by the AP and NEA as a second-team halfback, and by the UP as a third-team halfback, on the All-America team.

The Cougars played their four home games on campus at Rogers Field in Pullman, Washington.

Schedule

References

External links
 Game program: Montana at WSC – October 29, 1932
 Game program: Idaho at WSC – November 5, 1932

Washington State
Washington State Cougars football seasons
Washington State Cougars football